Kuuga may refer to:
 Kamen Rider Kuuga, a Japanese tokusatsu television series
 Kuuga (wrestler), Japanese professional wrestler